Changanasseri railway station (code: CGY) is a railway station in Kottayam district, Kerala and falls under the Thiruvananthapuram railway division of the Southern Railway zone, Indian Railways. Changanassery is the second largest railway station in Kottayam district. It is an NSG 4 category station. There is a chance to halt few more trains in Changanacherry due to the increase in the number of the rushing passengers in Kottayam and Thiruvalla station from Kanjirappally, Changanassery and Kuttanad regions.

History
The first train running from Changanassery railway station was established in 1958. Though Railway traffic was set up at Ernakulam and Trivandrum in the form of Kerala, these connections were not directly connected. The metre-gauge line from Changanassery was moved by broad gauge and the railway transportation was started in 1976 by Chief minister of Kerala C. Achutha Menon.

Significance
Changanacherry railway station is the nearest rail station to reach famous pilgrimage places like Vazhappally Maha Siva Temple, Erumely, Basilica of St. Mary, Champakulam, Kuttanad, Vembanad Lake, Vagamon, Kumily, Thekkady, St Mary's Metropolitan Cathedral, Changanassery, Syro-Malabar Catholic Archeparchy of Changanassery. It serves the people of 3 districts – Kottayam, Alappuzha and Idukki district.

Changanacherry station is expected to get ISO certification soon.

Changanacherry station bagged 299th position among the stations cleanliness ranking by SWACHH RAIL, SWACHH BHARAT Cleanliness assessment of Non-Suburban and Suburban Stations by Ministry of Railways, India.

See also 
 Ernakulam–Kottayam–Kayamkulam line

References

External links 
 Indian Rail Info – Changanssery Railway Station

Railway stations in Kottayam district
Railway stations opened in 1904
Changanassery